Isidro Figueras (1 January 1913 – 1 March 1998) was a Spanish racing cyclist. He rode in the 1935 Tour de France.

References

External links
 

1913 births
1998 deaths
Spanish male cyclists
Place of birth missing
Cyclists from Barcelona